The 2018 Sun Belt women's basketball tournament was the postseason women's basketball tournament for the Sun Belt Conference, which began on March 6 and ended March 11, 2018, at the Lakefront Arena in New Orleans.

Seeds

Schedule

Bracket

All times listed are Central

See also
 2018 Sun Belt Conference men's basketball tournament

References

External links
 2018 Sun Belt Women's Basketball Championship

Sun Belt Conference women's basketball tournament
2017–18 Sun Belt Conference women's basketball season
Sun Belt Conference Women's B